Peter Taylor (born 25 August 1954) is a former Australian rules footballer who played with North Melbourne in the Victorian Football League (VFL).

Notes

External links 

Living people
1954 births
Australian rules footballers from New South Wales
North Melbourne Football Club players
Albury Football Club players